Bowling pins (historically also known as skittles or kegels) are the target of the bowling ball in various bowling games including tenpins, five-pins, duckpins and candlepins.

Tenpins 

Pin specifications are set by the United States Bowling Congress (USBC). World Bowling, formerly World Tenpin Bowling Association, has adopted the USBC specifications. The first British made tenpin was by H Massil and sons who received the permit no.1 from the British Tenpin Bowling Association (BTBA)

Duckpins and fivepins 

Duckpins are shorter and squatter than standard tenpins. Canadian fivepins are between duckpins and tenpins in size, but have a thick, inch-wide rubber band around the widest part of the pin to increase pin action when struck.

Candlepins 

They are nearly cylindrical in shape with a slight taper toward either end, making them vaguely resemble candles (hence the name). Unlike other bowling pins, because they are vertically symmetrical, candlepins may be set on either end. Due to their width and construction, candlepins tends to produce a billiard ball-like sound when struck.

Kegels

Pins used in the German bowling game kegel appears to combine the design of tenpins and duckpins. The overall shape of the pin resembles a standard ten-pin bowling pins, and its small size is comparable to duckpins. Similar to five-pin bowling, these pins have strings attached on top of each, which connects them to the pinsetter.

Pin construction 
Bowling pins are constructed by gluing blocks of rock maple wood into the approximate shape, and then turning on a lathe. After the lathe shapes the pin, it is coated with a plastic material, painted, and covered with a glossy finish. Because of the scarcity of suitable wood, bowling pins can be made from approved synthetics. Currently there are synthetic pins sanctioned for play in five-pin, duckpin, and candlepin. There is one synthetic ten pin model approved by the USBC. When hit by the ball, synthetic pins usually sound different from wooden pins.

Juggling clubs could be mistaken for bowling pins due to their similar shape. The two differ greatly in construction and weight.

See also
Bowling pin shooting
 Ten-pin bowling
 Nine-pin bowling
 Candlepin bowling
 Duckpin bowling
 Five-pin bowling

References

External links
How bowling pins are made
How much does a bowling pin weight
Bowlinglinks all over the World, sorted by categories

Bowling
Ten-pin bowling